Richard M. Pollack (January 25, 1935 – September 18, 2018) was an American geometer who spent most of his career at the Courant Institute of Mathematical Sciences at New York University, where he was Professor Emeritus until his death.

Contributions
In combinatorics, Pollack published several papers with Paul Erdős and János Pach.

Pollack also published papers in discrete geometry. His work with Jacob E. Goodman includes the first nontrivial bounds on the number of order types and polytopes, and a generalization 
of the Hadwiger transversal theorem to higher dimensions. He and Goodman were the founding editors of the journal Discrete & Computational Geometry.

In real algebraic geometry, Pollack wrote a series of papers with Saugata Basu and Marie-Françoise Roy, as well as a book.

Awards and honors
In 2003, a collection of original research papers in discrete and computational geometry entitled Discrete and Computational Geometry: The Goodman–Pollack Festschrift was published as a tribute to Jacob E. Goodman and Richard Pollack on the occasion of their 2/3 × 100 birthdays.

In 2012, he became a fellow of the American Mathematical Society.

A special memorial 556-page issue of Discrete & Computational Geometry for Pollack was published in October 2020.

References 

.
.

1935 births
2018 deaths
20th-century American mathematicians
21st-century American mathematicians
Geometers
Fellows of the American Mathematical Society
Courant Institute of Mathematical Sciences faculty
Brooklyn College alumni
People from New York City